Daniel J. Fritsche (born July 13, 1985) is a Swiss-American former professional ice hockey forward. He played for Genève-Servette HC, HC Lugano and the ZSC Lions in the National League (NL) and in the National Hockey League (NHL) for the Columbus Blue Jackets, the New York Rangers and the Minnesota Wild.

Playing career
Fritsche began his junior hockey career with his hometown Cleveland Barons of the North American Hockey League. He then played for the Sarnia Sting and the London Knights, and won a gold medal at the 2004 World Junior Hockey Championship, playing for the United States. He won a Memorial Cup playing for the Knights in 2005. He also played youth hockey for the Parma Flyers and is one of three players to go into the NHL from there. The other two players are Brian Holzinger and Michael Rupp.

Fritsche was ranked in the top ten in nearly every pre-draft report, but shoulder concerns scared teams away. He was drafted in the second round of the 2003 NHL Entry Draft, 46th overall, by the Columbus Blue Jackets. After playing for parts of four seasons with the Blue Jackets, Fritsche was traded along with Nikolai Zherdev to the New York Rangers on July 2, 2008 for defensemen Fedor Tyutin and Christian Bäckman.

On January 29, 2009, Fritsche was traded by the Rangers to the Minnesota Wild for defenseman Erik Reitz. After finishing the season with the Wild, Fritsche was not tendered a qualifying offer and became an unrestricted free agent on July 1, 2009.

On September 3, 2009, Fritsche was invited to the Atlanta Thrashers training camp for the 2009–10 season, but was not offered a contract. On October 5, 2009, he returned to the Blue Jackets organization by signing a contract with the AHL's Syracuse Crunch.

In 2010, Fritsche began playing in Switzerland's National League A for Geneve-Servette HC (GSHC).

In January 2013, he signed a three-year contract with the HC Lugano that extended him with the team through 2016. However, on November 29, 2013, Fritsche was traded to ZSC Lions, who were coached by Marc Crawford. Zurich won the 2013–14 NLA championship and Fritsche played a pivotal role in scoring four point in four games during the finals.

National team 
Fritsche won gold with the US national team at the 2004 World Junior Ice Hockey Championships and also represented the country at the 2005 WJC. He made his debut on the Swiss Men's National Team in December 2014. According to IIHF rules, he had to play four years in Switzerland before being eligible to represent Switzerland.

Personal life
His great-grandparents emigrated from Appenzell, Switzerland, to the United States.

His younger brother, Tom Fritsche, was a prospect in the Colorado Avalanche system. He was drafted 47th overall, in the 2005 NHL Entry Draft. His career was cut short due to concussion. His cousin, John, plays for Fribourg-Gottéron. His uncle, John Fritsche Sr., was a longtime player in Switzerland for HC Ambri-Piotta, HC Lugano and EV Zug, played for the United States at the 1990 World Hockey Championship, and coached the Ohio Junior Blue Jackets.

Career statistics

Regular season and playoffs

International

References

External links

1985 births
Living people
American men's ice hockey left wingers
American people of Swiss descent
Columbus Blue Jackets draft picks
Columbus Blue Jackets players
Dan
Genève-Servette HC players
HC Lugano players
Ice hockey players from Ohio
London Knights players
Minnesota Wild players
New York Rangers players
People from Parma, Ohio
Sarnia Sting players
Sportspeople from Cuyahoga County, Ohio
Syracuse Crunch players
ZSC Lions players
Swiss ice hockey players